Something in the Dirt is a 2022 American science fiction comedy horror film written by Justin Benson and directed by and starring Benson and Aaron Moorhead. It is the fifth feature film by the directing duo.

The film had its world premiere online at the 2022 Sundance Film Festival in January 2022.

Plot
A man wakes up in a small, dirty apartment. Conversations with a neighbor establish this man as Levi, a spear-fisher and worker at odd jobs. The neighbor, John, is a sometime math teacher who attends an evangelical apocalyptic church. Together the pair notice that objects made of quartz sometimes float and glow supernaturally in their apartment, revealing a certain symbol, and various lights, noises, tremors and radio signals can be heard.

The pair work together to create a documentary film about this phenomenon, following up on clues and coincidences that begin to occur all over Los Angeles related to it. At several points, Levi suggests to John that the pursuit has become dangerous and recommends stopping, but John rushes ahead heedlessly. John often maligns Levi’s theories in favor of his own, constantly-changing ones, and begins to display signs of sociopathy and pathological lying.

Eventually, the two men have an argument. That night, John wakes up floating in the air and falls back into bed. He goes outside to see Levi floating high in the sky. Documentary-style interview scenes see John explaining that Levi died as a result. An interviewer asks John to explain the supernatural phenomena. John only says that his calculations were off and refuses to elaborate further.

Cast
 Justin Benson as Levi
 Aaron Moorhead as John

Production
Benson and Moorhead conceived of the film during the 2020 COVID-19 lockdowns. It was shot over the course of a year with a crew of 12. Benson's own apartment served as the primary location of the film.

Reception

References

External links
 

2022 science fiction films
2022 comedy films
American science fiction comedy films
2022 independent films
American independent films
2020s English-language films
2020s mockumentary films
American mockumentary films
Films about conspiracy theories
Films set in Los Angeles
Films shot in Los Angeles
Films directed by Justin Benson
Films directed by Aaron Moorhead
2020s American films